Humming is a noise.

Humming may also refer to:

Humming (film), 2008
Humming (album), a 1998 album by Duncan Sheik

Songs
"Humming", by Portishead from the self-titled album, 1997
"Humming", by Turnover from Peripheral Vision, 2015
"Humming", by Wire from Mind Hive, 2020

See also
Hum (disambiguation)